The 1993 Pacific Curling Championships were held from November 1 to ??? in Adelaide, Australia.

Australia won the men's event over Japan (it was the third Pacific title for the Australian men). On the women's side, Japan defeated Australia in the final (it was the second Pacific title for the Japanese women).

By virtue of winning, the Australian men's team and the Japanese women's team qualified for the 1994 World  and  Curling Championships in Oberstdorf, Germany.

Men

Teams

Round Robin

 Team to final
 Teams to semifinal

Playoffs

Final standings

Women

Teams

Round Robin

 Teams to playoffs

Playoffs
No any data about playoffs in WCF database.

Final standings

References

External links

Pacific Curling Championships, 1993
Pacific-Asia Curling Championships
International curling competitions hosted by Australia
1993 in Australian sport
Sport in Adelaide
November 1993 sports events in Australia